Huawei Ascend W2 is the second smartphone in the Huawei Ascend line of devices to run the Windows 8 operating system.

W2
Windows Phone devices
Discontinued smartphones